D-5-AS-TV, channel 5, is a local commercial television station owned by GMA Network Inc. Its studio is located at the Red Dot Building, corner General Luna and Lagasca Streets, Barangay 10, Laoag City and transmitter located at Brgy. San Lorenzo, San Nicolas, Ilocos Norte. Its former studio was located in Agcaoili Building, Abadilla Street, Laoag City.

History
December 25, 1962 - D-5-AS-TV channel 5, Ilocos Region's first television station, was launched by RBS TV (now GMA Network), a year after DZBB-TV Channel 7 in Manila was founded on October 29, 1961, when it started operations.
1976 - D-5-AS-TV was launched under the ownership of RBS with the identification of GMA Radio-Television Arts through Republic Broadcasting System, Inc. as its corporate name 14 years later. The network relaunched aside from sporting a light blue square logo with the network name in white, also had the using of the circle 5 logo, in its final years the blue circle 12 logo used was similar to those used by the ABC is some United States cities and later used the rainbow colors of red, yellow, green and blue stripes.
April 30, 1992 - Coinciding with the network's Rainbow Satellite Network launch, GMA Channel 5 Ilocos Norte started its nationwide satellite broadcast to bring live broadcasts of Manila-sourced national programming via DZBB-TV, GMA's flagship TV station in Manila, to viewers in the Ilocos Region, utilizes a new logo to correspond with the rebranding and a satellite-beaming rainbow in a multicolored striped based on the traditional scheme of red, orange, yellow, green, blue, indigo and violet, with GMA in a metallic form uses a San Serif Country Gothic Extra Bold and analogous gloominess of indigo as its fonts in the letters.
May 16, 1996 - Republic Broadcasting System formally changed its corporate name to GMA Network Incorporated, with GMA now standing for Global Media Arts.
June 7, 2012 - GMA Ilocos launched as an originating station, which primarily covers the provinces of Ilocos Norte (via Channel 5), Abra (Channel 7) and Ilocos Sur (via Channel 48).
June 25, 2012 – November 7, 2014 - GMA Ilocos launched its flagship local newscast Balitang Ilokano.
November 10, 2014 – April 24, 2015 - GMA Ilocos relaunched its flagship local newscast 24 Oras Ilokano.
October 3, 2016 - GMA Ilocos began to simulcast GMA Dagupan's Balitang Amianan.
2022 - GMA Ilocos begins to split into two: GMA Ilocos Sur and GMA Ilocos Norte. On September 5, Balitang Amianan was relaunched as One North Central Luzon.
March 17, 2023 - GMA Ilocos Norte inaugurated the state-of-the-art facility and studios located at Red Dot Building, corner General Luna and Lagasca Streets, Barangay 10, Laoag City. Weeks prior to the inauguration, One North Central Luzon anchor CJ Torida, who happened to be a former personality of the now-defunct Super Radyo Laoag, anchored the program live from the said facility.

GMA TV-5 Ilocos Norte currently aired programs
One North Central Luzon - flagship afternoon newscast (simulcast on GMA TV-10 Dagupan)
Mornings with GMA Regional TV - flagship morning newscast (simulcast on GMA TV-10 Dagupan)

GMA TV-5 Ilocos Norte previously programs
Let's Fiesta
Balitang Ilokano
24 Oras Ilokano 
Visita Iglesia

See also
List of GMA Network stations

References

Television stations in the Philippines
Television channels and stations established in 1962
Television stations in Laoag
GMA Network stations